Leo McGuirk (3 May 1908 – 27 March 1973) was an Australian cricketer. He played one first-class match for New South Wales in 1930/31.

See also
 List of New South Wales representative cricketers

References

External links
 

1908 births
1973 deaths
Australian cricketers
New South Wales cricketers